is a Shinto shrine located in Shingu, Wakayama Prefecture, on the shores of the Kumanogawa in the Kii Peninsula of Japan. It is included as part of the Kumano Sanzan in the UNESCO World Heritage site "Sacred Sites and Pilgrimage Routes in the Kii Mountain Range".

See also
List of National Treasures of Japan (crafts-others)
List of National Treasures of Japan (sculptures)
Sacred Nagi Tree of Kumano Hayatama Taisha

Notes

References 
 Kumano Sanzan  accessed on December 1, 2008
 Kumano Hayatama Taisha  accessed on December 1, 2008
 Sacred site "Kumano Sanzan" accessed on June 12, 2008

External links
 Tanabe City Kumano Tourism Bureau 

Kanpei-taisha
Beppyo shrines
Shinto shrines in Wakayama Prefecture
World Heritage Sites in Japan